The Beni Suef Cultural Palace fire occurred in Beni Suef, Egypt, on September 5, 2005 and killed 46 people.

The Cultural Palace was overcrowded at the occasion of  the Amateur Theatre Festival when a burning candle lit paper scenery on the stage and started a conflagration. A stampede erupted  towards a single exit. Fire extinguishing equipment was locked in a distant room, and fire engines and ambulances arrived late and unprepared People died both from burns and in the stampede.

In the aftermath  the Minister of Culture, Farouk Hosni, resigned, a move that was later revoked by President Hosni Mubarak. In May 2006 eight cultural bureaucrats  were convicted for negligence and received ten-year prison sentences.

The fire drastically affected the theatrical community of Egypt who had come to the Cultural Palace on that day for the festival. September 5 has been named the National Day of Theatre in remembrance.

References

External links
 Who is to blame for the Beni Suef theatre tragedy? Retrieved on 2008-08-29

Beni Suef
2005 disasters in Africa
Fires in Egypt
2005 in Egypt
2005 fires in Africa
Theatre fires
September 2005 events in Africa